Sir William Walter Mulholland  (8 January 1887 – 9 November 1971) was a notable New Zealand farmer and farmers' union leader. He was born in Greendale, North Canterbury, New Zealand, on 8 January 1887.

Mullholland was appointed an Officer of the Order of the British Empire, for services as the president of the Farmers' Union, in the 1946 New Year Honours. In the 1956 New Year Honours, he was appointed a Knight Bachelor, for services to farming.

References

1887 births
1971 deaths
New Zealand farmers
People from Greendale, New Zealand
New Zealand Officers of the Order of the British Empire
New Zealand Knights Bachelor